The Sompower is a private electric utility company based in Hargeisa, Somaliland. It specialises generating, transmitting and distributing of the electric power. Founded in 2016 by the merger of 39 local utility firms. It is one of the largest utility companies in Somaliland.

See also

 List of companies of Somaliland
 KAAH Electric
 Somali Energy Company

References

External links
 

Companies based in Hargeisa
Companies of Somaliland
Energy companies established in 2016
2016 establishments in Somaliland